Liuchong River Bridge is a cable-stayed bridge near Zhijin, Guizhou, China. At , the bridge is one of the 20 highest in world. The bridge is part of the new S55 Qianzhi Expressway between Zhijin and Qianxi in Guizhou province that opened in 2013. The bridge crosses the Liuchong River gorge.

See also 
List of highest bridges in the world
List of tallest bridges in the world
List of largest cable-stayed bridges

References

External links

Bridges in Guizhou
Cable-stayed bridges in China
Bijie
Liuchong River
Bridges completed in 2013